Aleksandra "Ola" Szwed (born 8 August 1990 in Warsaw, Poland) is a Polish actress and singer of Polish and Nigerian ethnicity.  She was a popular child actress, starring regularly since 1999 in Rodzina zastępcza (Foster Family) television series, modified and renamed in 2004 to Rodzina zastępcza plus (Foster Family and Others). She also stars on TV talent shows. Before getting into television, she sang and danced in a children group backing the singer Majka Jeżowska.  Szwed was on Season 11 of Taniec z Gwiazdami (the Polish version of Dancing with the Stars) in 2010. Six years later she won 5th season of Twoja Twarz Brzmi Znajomo (local version of Your Face Sounds Familiar format).

Filmography
2013-2017:   Barwy szczęścia (TV)
2002:       Bardzo dużo Sylwestrów (TV)
2001:       Kolęda z komórki (TV)
2000:       Uwolnić Mikołaja (TV)
1999:       Świąteczna awaria (TV)
1999–2009:  Rodzina Zastępcza (tv-series)

References

External links

1990 births
Living people
20th-century Polish actresses
21st-century Polish actresses
Actresses from Warsaw

Polish child actresses
Polish people of Nigerian descent
Polish television actresses
SWPS University alumni